Jean-Paul Laurens (28 March 1838 – 23 March 1921) was a French painter and sculptor, and one of the last major exponents of the French Academic style.

Biography
Laurens was born in Fourquevaux and was a pupil of Léon Cogniet and Alexandre Bida. Strongly anti-clerical and republican, his work was often on historical and religious themes, through which he sought to convey a message of opposition to monarchical and clerical oppression. His erudition and technical mastery were much admired in his time, but in later years his highly realistic technique, coupled to a theatrical mise-en-scène, came to be regarded by some art-historians as overly didactic. More recently, however, his work has been re-evaluated as an important and original renewal of history painting, a genre of painting that was in decline during Laurens' lifetime.

Laurens was commissioned to paint numerous public works by the French Third Republic, including the steel vault of the Paris City Hall, the monumental series on the life of Saint Genevieve in the apse of the Panthéon, the decorated ceiling of the Odéon Theater, and the hall of distinguished citizens at the Toulouse capitol. He also provided illustrations for Augustin Thierry's Récits des temps mérovingiens ("Accounts of Merovingian Times").

Laurens was highly respected teacher at the Académie Julian, Paris, and a professor at the École nationale supérieure des Beaux-Arts in Paris, where he taught André Dunoyer de Segonzac and George Barbier. He died in Paris, aged 82. Two of his sons, Paul Albert Laurens (1870–1934) and Jean-Pierre Laurens (1875–1932), both also became painters and teachers at the Académie Julian.

Notable students

 Moussa Ayoub
 Marjorie Bates
 Emilio Boggio
 Catharine Carter Critcher
 Cecilia Cutescu-Storck
 Angèle Delasalle
 Georges Dufrénoy
 Ludwig Deutsch
 Sears Gallagher
 'Harry' Phelan Gibb
 Kahlil Gibran
 Thomas Cooper Gotch
 Louise Herreshoff
 Christian Herter of Herter Brothers
 Will Hutchins
 A. Y. Jackson
 Gustave Louis Jaulmes
 Alfred Garth Jones
 Leon Kroll
 Mortimer Lichtenauer
 Arturo Michelena
 Ella Ferris Pell
 Cristóbal Rojas
 Robert Poughéon
 Alexander Rummler
 Paul Sibra
 René Schützenberger
 William Somerville Shanks
 Aurélia de Souza
 Sofia Martins de Sousa
 Henry Scott Tuke
 Karl Yens

References

Further reading
 
 

1838 births
1921 deaths
People from Haute-Garonne
Academic staff of the Académie Julian
French muralists
19th-century French painters
French male painters
20th-century French painters
20th-century French male artists
Academic art
Academic staff of the École des Beaux-Arts
20th-century French sculptors
19th-century French sculptors
French male sculptors
Honorary Members of the Royal Academy
19th-century French male artists